TSSF can refer to:

 Third Order, Society of Saint Francis, an Anglican Religious order
 The Story So Far (band), a Californian pop punk band